The term Axis of Resistance refers to an anti-Western, anti-Israeli, and anti-Saudi political and informal military alliance between Iran, Palestine, the Syrian Government, and the Lebanese militant group Hezbollah. Pro-Syrian government militias, Iraqi Shia militias that are part of the Iraqi Government-sanctioned Popular Mobilization Forces, and the Yemeni Houthi movement (officially: "Ansar Allah") are also considered part of the alliance.

Despite the alliance's differing ideologies, such as secular Ba'athism, Communism, and Shia Islamism, they are unified by their goal of opposing the activities of pro-Western parties, Israel, Gulf states, Sunni Islamists, and the MEK in the region. Russia and China have also been considered by Iran as part of the alliance, due to their anti-Western political stance and mostly positive relations with Iran and Syria.

History

The term was used by the Libyan daily newspaper Al-Zahf Al-Akhdar in response to American president George W. Bush's claim that Iran, Iraq, and North Korea formed an "axis of evil." In an article titled "Axis of evil or axis of resistance", the paper wrote in 2002 that "the only common denominator among Iran, Iraq, and North Korea is their resistance to US hegemony." The Iranian newspaper Jomhuri-ye Eslami subsequently adopted the language in reference to the Shia insurgency in Iraq, writing in 2004 that "if the line of Iraq's Shi'is needs to be linked, united, and consolidated, this unity should be realized on the axis of resistance and struggle against the occupiers."

In 2006, the Palestinian minister of the interior, Said Saim, used the term during an interview at Al-Alam television to refer to common political goals among Arabs in opposition to those of Israel or the United States. Noting the large number of Palestinian refugees in Syria, Saim stated, "Syria is also an Islamic Arab country and is also targeted by the Americans and the Zionists. Hence, we see in Syria, Iran, Hezbollah, and Hamas an axis of resistance in front of these pressures."

The term "axis of resistance" was used as early as August 2010. After two years, Ali Akbar Velayati, senior advisor for foreign affairs to Iran's supreme leader, used the term and said:

The phrase was used again in August 2012 during a meeting between Syrian president Bashar al-Assad and the secretary of Iran's Supreme National Security Council, Saeed Jalili, regarding the Syrian Civil War. He said:

The Syrian state-run news agency, SANA, has stated that the two governments discussed their "strategic cooperation relationship" and "attempts by some Western countries and their allies to strike at the axis of resistance by targeting Syria and supporting terrorism there." The alliance has been described as an "Axis of Terror" by the prime minister and ambassadors of Israel.

With Hezbollah's intensifying participation in the Syrian civil war following the years after 2013, the coalition has become explicitly Khomeinist and anti-Sunni; with the Assad regime becoming beholden and subservient to Iran and its proxies for continued existence. Alienated by sectarian policies, Sunni Islamists such as Muslim Brotherhood and Hamas began publicly opposing Iran and Hezbollah and have aligned closely with Turkey and Qatar, countries which are engaged in geo-political competition with Iran.

Background

At first, the alliance consisted of the Syrian government and Lebanese Hezbollah. Years later, Iran, already closely aligned with Syria and Hezbollah, would form stronger relations between the three, creating the axis. Iraqi and Yemeni militants coordinating with Iran came in as the newest members of this alliance. After the beginning of Russian involvement in the Syrian Civil War, a slew of posters showing images of Nasrallah, Assad, Khamenei, and Russian President Vladimir Putin, have appeared with an Arabic caption meaning, "Men who bow to no one but God." The posters suggest another emerging regional Axis of Resistance, according to The Hill. However, this coalition has been described as "deeply polarising" for its sectarian targeting of Sunni Syrians. Hezbollah's actions have also arisen denunciation in Lebanon, most notably from Lebanese President Michael Sulieman, who demanded an end to unilateral armed maneuvers by Hezbollah. Grievance is also widespread amongst Lebanon's Sunni minority, who charge Hezbollah with engaging in sectarian violence against other Muslims, and of forfeiting its anti-Zionist stance.

Analysis
The axis has been described as altering "the strategic balance in the Middle East" by assisting Syrian dictator Bashar al-Assad to remain in power and backing his war-crimes against Syrian civilians. According to Marisa Sullivan, the programme of the Axis has three main pillars; shared regional objective in preserving the Assad regime, maintaining access to supplies of weapons and money from Iran, and stopping a Sunni-majority government from ever coming to power in Syria.
The current ruling minority of Syria is primarily made up of Alawites, who are a sect of Shia Islam, which is also the majority religion of Iran. This common background has made them strategic allies on various issues, including defense. The Popular Front for the Liberation of Palestine, although a Marxist-Leninist formation, is generally considered part of the Axis of Resistance, and receives support from Iran. The Sunni Palestinian Islamist movement Hamas has also at times been considered part of the axis due to its opposition to Israel and the United States. However, as of March 2012, the group has since pulled its headquarters out of Damascus and thrown its support behind the anti-Assad Syrian opposition.

Iran–Syria

According to Jubin Goodarzi, an assistant professor and researcher at Webster University, the Iranian–Syrian alliance that was formed in 1979 is of great importance to the emergence and continuity of the axis of resistance. Both countries are in key locations of the Middle East, and they have been affecting Middle Eastern politics during the past three decades. Also, the alliance is considered to be an enduring one, lasting 34 years "in spite of the many challenges that it has faced and periodic strains in the relationship".

Axis of resistance vs. Israel

The axis claims to be against Israel in order to shore up popular support across the Islamic world, according to Tallha Abdulrazaq, writing in the Middle East Monitor, and it took a severe blow after the Israeli Mazraat Amal air strike. Three days before that airstrike against the Hizbollah convoy, Hizbollah leader, Hassan Nasrallah said: "...we consider that any strike against Syria is a strike against the whole of the resistance axis, not just against Syria."

Axis of resistance vs. ISIL

Hezbollah rejects the idea of Lebanon helping in the U.S.-led intervention in Iraq, arguing that it may lead to the U.S domination in the region or "substituting terrorism with flagrant US occupation".

Taliban–Iran relations

Ali Akbar Velayati, an advisor to Supreme Leader Ali Khamenei, described the Taliban's Islamic Emirate of Afghanistan as part of the Axis of Resistance, with Iran at its core, a coalition of nations seeking “resistance, independence, and freedom.”

The prominent Principalist daily publication in Iran, Kayhan, has also begun referring to the Islamic Emirate of Afghanistan as a member of the Axis of Resistance.

See also
 Arab–Israeli alliance against Iran
 Russia–Syria–Iran–Iraq coalition, another military alliance that involves Iran, Syria and Russia
 Shia crescent
 Foreign involvement in the Syrian civil war
 Iran–Israel proxy conflict
 Iran–Israel conflict during the Syrian civil war
 Iran–Saudi Arabia proxy conflict

References

 
Shia Islam and politics
Anti-Zionism in the Middle East
Anti-Western sentiment
Foreign involvement in the Syrian civil war
Iranian involvement in the Syrian civil war
Hezbollah involvement in the Syrian civil war
Russian involvement in the Syrian civil war
Foreign relations of China
Foreign relations of Iran
Foreign relations of Russia
Foreign relations of Syria
China–Iran relations
China–Iran military relations
China–Iraq relations
China–Russia relations
China–Russia military relations
China–Syria relations
China–Yemen relations
Iran–Iraq relations
Iran–Russia relations
Iran–Russia military relations
Iran–Syria relations
Iran–Syria military relations
Iran–Yemen relations
Iraq–Russia relations
Russia–Syria relations
Russia–Syria military relations
Russia–Yemen relations
Iran–Israel proxy conflict
Iran–Saudi Arabia proxy conflict
Military alliances involving China
Military alliances involving Iran
Military alliances involving Iraq
Military alliances involving Russia
Military alliances involving Syria
Military alliances involving Yemen
Khomeinist groups